Encadenados, (English: Notorious) is a 1969 Mexican telenovela produced by Televisa and originally transmitted by Telesistema Mexicano.

Cast 
Ofelia Montesco
Raúl Farell
Dacia González
Tito Junco

References

External links 

Mexican telenovelas
Televisa telenovelas
Spanish-language telenovelas
1969 telenovelas
1969 Mexican television series debuts
1969 Mexican television series endings